In mathematics, LHS is informal shorthand for the left-hand side of an equation.  Similarly, RHS is the right-hand side. The two sides have the same value, expressed differently, since equality is symmetric.

More generally, these terms may apply to an inequation or inequality; the right-hand side is everything on the right side of a test operator in an expression, with LHS defined similarly.

Example 
The expression on the right side of the "=" sign is the right side of the equation and the expression on the left of the "=" is the left side of the equation.

For example, in

Homogeneous and inhomogeneous equations
In solving mathematical equations, particularly linear simultaneous equations, differential equations and integral equations, the terminology homogeneous is often used for equations with some linear operator L on the LHS and 0 on the RHS. In contrast, an equation with a non-zero RHS is called inhomogeneous or non-homogeneous, as exemplified by

Lf = g,

with g a fixed function, which equation is to be solved for f. Then any solution of the inhomogeneous equation may have a solution of the homogeneous equation added to it, and still remain a solution.

For example in mathematical physics, the homogeneous equation may correspond to a physical theory formulated in empty space, while the inhomogeneous equation asks for more 'realistic' solutions with some matter, or charged particles.

Syntax
More abstractly, when using infix notation

T * U

the term T stands as the left-hand side and U as the right-hand side of the operator *. This usage is less common, though.

See also
 Equals sign

References

Mathematical terminology